The 1980 Temple Owls football team was an American football team that represented Temple University as an independent during the 1980 NCAA Division I-A football season. In its 11th season under head coach Wayne Hardin, the team compiled a 4–7 record and was outscored by a total of 262 to 170. The team played its home games at Veterans Stadium in Philadelphia.

Schedule

References

Temple
Temple Owls football seasons
Temple Owls football